Once You're Born You Can No Longer Hide is a 2005 Italian drama film directed by Marco Tullio Giordana.  The film concerns undocumented migration to Italy via the Mediterranean Sea.

Plot
A young Italian boy accidentally falls overboard while yachting with his father on the Mediterranean.  He is rescued by a boatload of undocumented immigrants attempting to reach Italy by sailing across the Mediterranean.  On the ship, he is befriended by a young Romanian man and his sister.  The film follows the relationship of the Italian boy with the Romanian once they reach the Italian shores.

Cast
 Alessio Boni - Bruno
 Michela Cescon - Lucia
 Rodolfo Corsato - Popi
 Matteo Gadola - Sandro
 Ester Hazan - Alina
 Vlad Alexandru Toma - Radu
 Marcello Prayer - Tore
 Giovanni Martorana - Barracano
 Simona Solder - Maura
 Andrea Tidona - Padre Celso
 Adriana Asti

Awards
 Prix François Chalais, 2005 Cannes Film Festival
 Nastro d'Argento Best Producers

See also 
 Movies about immigration to Italy

References

External links 
 

2005 films
2005 drama films
Italian drama films
French drama films
2000s Italian-language films
Films set in Italy
Films directed by Marco Tullio Giordana
Films about immigration
Films set in the Mediterranean Sea
2000s Italian films
2000s French films
Italian-language French films